Joe & Mac 2: Lost in the Tropics, known in the PAL region as Joe & Mac 3: Lost in the Tropics, is a Super Nintendo Entertainment System video game and a sequel to Joe & Mac. It is the follow-up to Congo's Caper, the second game in the series.

Gameplay
A caveman named Gork has stolen the crown belonging to the Chief of Kali Village, and it's up to the player to retrieve it by using the seven rainbow stones that he will receive in the story.

The object of the game is to defeat Neanderthals with two caveman ninja heroes along with dinosaurs and huge level bosses. Each player controls either Joe or Mac with limited lives and continues. Players can also choose to fall in love with a girlfriend in their Stone Age village; giving her flowers and meat as presents. Once the player gets married, he gets to father a child. Stone wheels are the official currency in the game and players can replay levels in order to get more stone wheels. An overhead free roam map offers a chance for players to select their level like they were playing a console role-playing game. The action-packed levels are in side view.

Boss enemies include Stegosaurus, Pteranodon, Triceratops, Elasmosaurus, and Tyrannosaurus. After defeating each boss, the player will earn one of the rainbow stones. During the game, friendly creatures such as Pteranodon, Styracosaurus and Plesiosaurus will give the player a ride.

The game features six levels, including a valley, a jungle, a snowy mountain range, a swamp, and a volcano. In the final level, the player must defeat each of the boss enemies a second time before battling Gork. When Gork is defeated, he gains power from the crown and turns into a warthog demon. When Gork is defeated a second time, the player will earn the crown and end the game.

Re-releases
Joe & Mac 2: Lost in the Tropics  has been re-released several times since its original incarnation.

In late 2017, it was part of a compilation cartridge by Retro-Bit for the Super NES titled Data East Joe & Mac: Ultimate Caveman Collection which also includes the SNES version of Joe & Mac and Congo's Caper. Like other cartridges that came after the console's lifespan, the compilation was not licensed by Nintendo, but was nonetheless authorized by G-Mode, the copyright holder of the game.

Since September 5, 2019, the game is available on the Switch Online service for the Nintendo Switch. In 2020, it was released for the Evercade handheld console.

Reception

GamePro gave the game a moderately positive review. In 2011, IGN listed the game as number 61 on their list of the top 100 SNES video games. Total! gave the game an average review, noting its gameplay as bland and easy difficulty. Super Gamer gave the game a review score of 75%. Nintendo Game Zone gave a review score of 89%. They praised the game music and the gameplay style for having unique variations in the levels of the game.

Notes

References

External links
 Tatakae Genshijin 3 - Shuyaku ha Yappari - Joe & Mac at superfamicom.org
 戦え原始人3 / Tatakae Genshijin 3 at super-famicom.jp 

1994 video games
Data East video games
Multiplayer and single-player video games
Platform games
Prehistoric people in popular culture
Super Nintendo Entertainment System games
Video game sequels
Video games developed in Japan
Video games set in prehistory
Fiction about neanderthals
Dinosaurs in video games
Evercade games
Nintendo Switch Online games

ja:戦え原始人#戦え原始人3 主役はやっぱりJOE&MAC